Nadeem Khayal Khan is a Pakistani politician from Pakistan Tehreek-e-Insaf. He has been a member-elect of the National Assembly of Pakistan since April 2022.

Political career

2022 
Khayal was elected as a member of the 17th National Assembly of Pakistan in the 2022 by-election from the NA-33 (Hangu) constituency as a candidate of Pakistan Tehreek-e-Insaf. He received 20,772 votes and defeated Obaid Ullah, a candidate of the Jamiat Ulema-e-Islam (F). 

Khayal was notified by the Election Commission of Pakistan on 30 April 2022, but has not yet taken oath as a member of the National Assembly.

References 

Living people
Pakistan Tehreek-e-Insaf politicians
Pashtun people
Pakistani MNAs 2018–2023
Pakistan Tehreek-e-Insaf MNAs
Year of birth missing (living people)